Habartice is a village and administrative part of Jindřichov in Šumperk District in the Olomouc Region of the Czech Republic.

Etymology
An original German name is created from name of its founder who was Eberhart and means "Eber's village". Czech name is a loan translation.

History
The village was founded by Germans. The first written mention is from 1351. It was a part of Third Reich during World War II. Ethnic Germans were expelled after the war and the village was repopulated by Czechs.

Geography and transport
Habartice is situated in upland meadows of Hanušovická vrchovina which are used for grazing. Direct road connection is available to Hanušovice, Jindřichov and Staré Město however its quality is below average.  
A public transport is very poor. Village doesn't have any shop, restaurant or a community house.

References

External link

Villages in Šumperk District
Neighbourhoods in the Czech Republic